The Lahore Qalandars (often abbreviated as LQ) is a franchise cricket team that represents Lahore, Punjab in the Pakistan Super League (PSL). The team is coach by Aaqib Javed, and captained by of Shaheen Afridi. In the final, they beat Multan Sultans by 42 runs to win their maiden PSL title.

Administration and coaching staff

Lahore Qalandars

Season standings

Points table

League fixtures and results

Playoffs

Qualifier

Eliminator 2

Final

References

External Links
 Team records in 2022 at ESPNcricinfo

2022 in Punjab, Pakistan
2022 Pakistan Super League
Qalandars in 2022
2022